Trevor Rashleigh  Lester was Dean of Waterford from 2003 until 2011.

Lester was born in 1950. He was educated at the Church of Ireland Theological Institute and ordained in 1990. After  curacies in Marmullane and Kilkenny he was the incumbent at Abbeystrewry until his appointment as Dean.

References

1955 births
Alumni of the Church of Ireland Theological Institute
Irish Anglicans
Deans of Waterford
Living people
Irish schoolteachers
Irish people of Swedish descent
Alumni of the National University of Ireland